USS Kansas City may refer to the following ships of the United States Navy:

  was to have been a heavy cruiser, but was canceled due to the end of World War II, just days after being laid down
  was a replenishment oiler in service from 1970 to 1994
  is an

See also
 

United States Navy ship names